Elizabeth Price may refer to:
Elizabeth Price (artist) (born 1966), British artist
Elizabeth Price (gymnast) (born 1996), American artistic gymnast
Elizabeth Price (golfer), English golfer
Elizabeth Price, a character in the Alice series

See also
Betsy Price, mayor of Fort Worth, Texas
Elizabeth Price Foley (born 1965), American legal theorist
Mary Elizabeth Price (1877–1965), American impressionist painter